Welcome to New York is an American sitcom television series created by Barbara Wallace and Thomas R. Wolfe, that aired on CBS. The show premiered October 11, 2000, and aired until January 17, 2001.

Premise and History
The show starred Jim Gaffigan, who played a weatherman from Fort Wayne, Indiana, who then moved to New York City and worked as a meteorologist for a fictional morning news show called "AM New York". Christine Baranski played Marsha Bickner, the larger-than-life, tightly-wound producer of "AM New York" who hired Jim, but tends to forget the details about his life – like where he moved from. CBS canceled the show due to low ratings.  Looking back, Gaffigan said, "I don’t think I had the maturity to take the authority I should have", and as he was not a contributing writer he felt the team would dismiss his ideas.

Cast
Jim Gaffigan as Jim Gaffigan
Christine Baranski as Marsha Bickner
Anthony DeSando as Vince Verbena
Mary Birdsong as Connie
Sara Gilbert as Amy Manning
Rocky Carroll as Adrian Spencer

Episodes

Reviews

The Pittsburgh Post-Gazette found the show to be "smart, telling comedy, but it's also an acquired taste."

References

External links
 

2000 American television series debuts
2001 American television series endings
2000s American sitcoms
CBS original programming
Television shows set in New York City
Television series by Worldwide Pants
Television series by CBS Studios
Television series by Universal Television